Eltingmühlenbach is a river of Lower Saxony and North Rhine-Westphalia, Germany. It flows into the Glane near Greven. On its course from near Bad Iburg to the southwest, it assumes several names: Glaner Bach, Oedingberger Bach and Aa.

See also
List of rivers of Lower Saxony
List of rivers of North Rhine-Westphalia

References

Rivers of Lower Saxony
Rivers of North Rhine-Westphalia
Rivers of Germany